Blow the Whistle is the sixteenth studio album by the American rapper Too Short. It was released on August 29, 2006, via Jive Records. It features artists such as Snoop Dogg, Rick Ross, Tha Dogg Pound, will.i.am, Mistah F.A.B. and David Banner. It features music production by Lil Jon, Jazze Pha and will.i.am of The Black Eyed Peas. The cover art for the album was revealed on August 8, 2006. The tracklisting was released on the 19th.

Track listing

Charts

References

Too Short albums
2006 albums
Albums produced by Jazze Pha
Albums produced by Lil Jon
Albums produced by will.i.am
Albums produced by Droop-E
Jive Records albums